Ivan Smith is a British mathematician who deals with symplectic manifolds and their interaction with algebraic geometry, low-dimensional topology, and dynamics. He is a professor at the University of Cambridge.

Education and career

Smith was born in 1973 to Neil Smith, a professor of linguistics at University College London. Smith studied at the University of Oxford, where he received his doctorate in 1999 under the supervision of Simon Donaldson  with thesis Symplectic Geometry of Lefschetz Fibrations. Smith is now a professor in Cambridge at Gonville & Caius College.

Among other things, Smith derived nodal invariants from symplectic geometry.

He received in 2007 the Whitehead Prize for his work in symplectic topology (highlighting the breadth of applied techniques from algebraic geometry and topology) and in 2013 the Adams Prize. In 2018 he was an invited speaker at the International Congress of Mathematicians in Rio de Janeiro.

Selected publications
 
 
 with Denis Auroux:  Lefschetz pencils, branched covers and symplectic invariants . In: Symplectic 4-manifolds and algebraic surfaces (Cetraro, 2003), Lect. Notes in Math. 1938, Springer, 2008, 1–53, Arxiv
 with Mohammed Abouzaid: "Homological mirror symmetry for the 4-torus", Duke Math. J., Vol. 152, 2010, pp. 373–440, Arxiv
  Floer cohomology and pencils of quadrics , Inventiones Mathematicae, Vol. 189, 2012, pp. 149–250, Arxiv
 "A symplectic prolegomenon", Bulletin AMS, Vol. 52, 2015, pp. 415–464, 
  Quiver algebras as Fukaya categories , Geom. Topol., Vol. 19, 2015, 2557–2617, Arxiv
 with Mohammed Abouzaid:  Khovanov homology from Floer cohomology , Arxiv 2015
 with Mohammed Abouzaid:  The symplectic arc algebra is formal , Duke Math. J., Vol. 165, 2016, pp. 985–1060, Arxiv

References

External links
 Homepage in Cambridge
 
 
 

20th-century British mathematicians
21st-century British mathematicians
Alumni of the University of Oxford
Differential geometers
Fellows of Gonville and Caius College, Cambridge
Whitehead Prize winners
1973 births
Living people
Topologists